La Extra is part of the Grupo Diario de Morelia, two newspapers in the city of Morelia, in the state of Michoacán in México. Diario de Morelia, morning newspaper with more than 65 years publishing and La Extra, afternoon newspaper with more than 45 years. Is printed in tabloid format and is based in Morelia. The Virtual Center Cervantes recognizes La Extra with one of the newspapers with digital edition.

See also
 List of newspapers in Mexico

References

External links
  Official website
  Entry in prensaescrita.com

1965 establishments in Mexico
Mass media in Morelia
Michoacán
Newspapers published in Mexico
Newspapers established in 1965
Spanish-language newspapers